Vít Chabičovský (born 19 May 2004) is a Czech curler.

At the international level, he is a 2020 Winter Youth Olympics mixed doubles bronze medallist.

At the national level, he is a one-time Czech mixed doubles champion curler (2022).

Teams

Men's

Mixed

Mixed doubles

References

External links

Living people
2004 births
Sportspeople from Prague
Czech male curlers
Czech curling champions
Curlers at the 2020 Winter Youth Olympics